Tezpur Medical College and Hospital (TMCH) is a medical college based in Tezpur, Assam, India established in 2013. This college is the 6th medical college of the State Government for the promotion of medical education in the state and counter the deficit to some extent. The college operates under the State Ministry of Health and Family Welfare, Assam.

TMCH offers undergraduate courses in medicine and surgery (MBBS) and postgraduate courses in various specialties such as anatomy, physiology, biochemistry, pathology, microbiology, pharmacology, forensic medicine, general medicine, and community medicine.

Departments
 Emergency & Trauma
 Anatomy
 Physiology
 Biochemistry & Metabolic Medicine
 Pharmacology
 Pathology
 Microbiology
 Forensic Medicine
 Toxicology
 Community Medicine
 General medicine
 Pediatrics
 Pulmonary Medicine
 Dermatology
 Psychiatry
 General Surgery
 Orthopedics
 Obstetrics and  Gynaecology
 Ophthalmology
 Otorhinolaryngology &  Head and Neck Surgery
 Anaesthesiology &  Critical Care
 Radiodiagnosis
 Dentistry

TMC at a glance

See also
 List of medical colleges in India
Assam Medical College and Hospital (AMCH), Dibrugarh
Gauhati Medical College and Hospital (GMCH), Guwahati
Silchar Medical College and Hospital (SMCH), Silchar

References

External links 
 

Affiliates of Srimanta Sankaradeva University of Health Sciences
Teaching hospitals in India
Medical colleges in Assam
Education in Tezpur
Educational institutions established in 2013
2013 establishments in Assam